HMS Orestes was a Repeat  which served in the Royal Navy during the First World War. The M class were an improvement on the previous , capable of higher speed. The vessel was launched on 21 March 1916 and joined the Grand Fleet. Orestes was involved in seeking submarines in the North Sea, patrolling both independently and as part of large operations. The destroyer did not report any submarines destroyed, but did rescue the survivors from Q-ship  after that vessel had successfully sunk the submarine  in a duel in March 1917. Later in the war, the focus was turned to escorting merchant ships and the destroyer helped secure convoys that crossed the Atlantic Ocean. After the Armistice that marked the end of the First World War, the destroyer was placed into reserve until being, on 30 January 1921, decommissioned and sold to be broken up.

Design and development
Orestes was one of twenty-two Repeat  destroyers ordered by the British Admiralty in November 1914 as part of the Third War Construction Programme. The M-class was an improved version of the earlier  destroyers, required to reach a higher speed in order to counter rumoured German fast destroyers. It transpired that the German ships did not exist but the greater performance was appreciated by the navy. The Repeat M class differed from the prewar vessels in having a raked stem and design improvements based on wartime experience.

Armament consisted of three single QF  Mk IV guns on the ship's centreline, with one on the forecastle, one aft on a raised platform and one between the middle and aft funnels on a bandstand. A single QF 2-pounder  "pom-pom" anti-aircraft gun was carried, while torpedo armament consisted of two twin mounts for  torpedoes. The ship had a complement of 80 officers and ratings.

Construction and career
Laid down by William Doxford & Sons of Sunderland in the River Wear, Orestes was launched on 21 March 1916 and completed during October that year. The destroyer was the sixth Royal Navy ship to be named after Orestes, the son of Clytemnestra, husband of Hermione, and king of Argos in Greek mythology. The vessel was deployed as part of the Grand Fleet, joining the Fourteenth Destroyer Flotilla based at Scapa Flow Orestes was soon in action and, on 10 November 1916, joined sister ship  and light cruiser  in a search for the German merchant ship SS Brandenburg.

The destroyer was subsequently deployed in anti-submarine warfare based at the naval base in Portsmouth. On 1 February 1917, Orestes started to patrol off the coast of Cornwall in response to a sighting of the submarine , which was deemed a threat to shipping. Fifteen days later, the destroyer attacked the submarine , but the enemy boat escaped unscathed. Patrols continued in the English Channel into the next month, but no further contact with submarines was made. The destroyer attempted to tow the stricken ship but was unsuccessful and Privet sank off Plymouth Sound.

Increasingly, patrols had not provided the security needed to shipping and the Admiralty redeployed the destroyers of the Grand Fleet to focus on the more effective convoy model. By 29 March, Orestes was one of only three left patrolling the North Sea seeking submarines. On 15 June, the vessel, along with the rest of the flotilla, was involved in a large sweep of the area west of the Shetland Islands searching for submarines, although Orestes was attached to the Eleventh Destroyer Flotilla. The destroyer did not sight any submarines. Shortly afterwards, the destroyer was transferred to the Northern Division of the Coast of Ireland Station at Buncrana. This allowed the destroyer to support the convoys travelling across the Atlantic Ocean from the American industrial complex at Hampton Roads. The harsh conditions of wartime operations, particularly the combination of high speed and the poor weather that is typical of the North Sea, exacerbated by the fact that the hull was not galvanised, meant that the destroyer soon worn out from such service.

After the armistice, the Royal Navy returned to a peacetime level of service and Orestes was declared superfluous to operational requirements. The destroyer was initially transferred back to Portsmouth on 17 October 1919 and placed in reserve. However, this did not last long as the navy needed to reduce both the number of ships and the amount of staff to save money. Orestes was decommissioned and, on 30 January 1921, sold to W. & A.T. Burdon to be broken up.

Pennant numbers

References

Citations

Bibliography

 
 
 
 
 
 
 
 
 
 
 
 
 
 
 
 

1916 ships
Admiralty M-class destroyers
Ships built on the River Wear
World War I destroyers of the United Kingdom